Wars between the Normans and the Byzantine Empire were fought from  1040 until 1185, when the last Norman invasion of the Byzantine Empire was defeated. At the end of the conflict, neither the Normans nor the Byzantines could boast much power, as by the mid-13th century exhaustive fighting with other powers had weakened both, leading to the Byzantines losing Asia Minor to the Ottoman Empire in the 15th century, and the Normans losing Sicily to the Hohenstaufen.

Norman conquest of southern Italy

The Normans' initial military involvement in southern Italy was on the side of the Lombards against the Byzantines. Eventually, some Normans, including the powerful de Hauteville brothers, served in the army of George Maniakes during the attempted Byzantine reconquest of Sicily, only to turn against their employers when the emirs proved difficult to conquer. By 1030, Rainulf became count of Aversa, marking the start of permanent Norman settlement in Italy. In 1042, William de Hauteville was made a count, taking Lombard prince Guaimar IV of Salerno as his liege. To further strengthen ties and legitimacy, Robert Guiscard also married Lombard Princess Sikelgaita in 1058.  Following the death of Guaimar, the Normans were increasingly independent actors on the south Italian scene, which brought them into direct conflict with Byzantium.

During the time that the Normans had conquered southern Italy, the Byzantine Empire was in a state of internal decay; the administration of the Empire had been wrecked, the efficient government institutions that provided Basil II with a quarter of a million troops and adequate resources by taxation had collapsed within a period of three decades. Attempts by Isaac I Komnenos and Romanos IV Diogenes to reverse the situation proved unfruitful. The premature death of the former and the overthrow of the latter led to further collapse as the Normans consolidated their conquest of Sicily and Italy.

Reggio Calabria, the capital of the tagma of Calabria, was captured by Robert Guiscard in 1060. At the time, the Byzantines held a few coastal towns in Apulia, including Bari, the capital of the catepanate of Italy. In 1067–68, they gave financial support to a rebellion against Guiscard. In 1068, the Normans besieged Otranto; in the same year, they began the siege of Bari itself. After defeating the Byzantines in a series of battles in Apulia, and after two major attempts to relieve the city had failed, the city Bari surrendered in April 1071, ending the Byzantine presence in southern Italy.

In 1079–80, the Byzantines again gave their support to a rebellion against Guiscard. This support came largely in the form of financing smaller Norman mercenary groups to assist in the rebellion

Over a thirty-year period (1061–1091), Norman factions also completed the initial Byzantine attempt to retake Sicily. However, it would not be until 1130 that both Sicily and southern Italy were united into one kingdom, formalized by Roger II of Sicily.

First Norman invasion of the Balkans (1081–1085)

Following their successful conquest of southern Italy, the Norman faction led by Robert Guiscard saw no reason to stop; Byzantium was decaying further still and looked ripe for conquest. Further pressing Norman motivation to invade was consistent support by the Byzantines for uprisings against Robert Guiscard. The Western edge of the Byzantine empire in particular was known for being a safe haven for rebel groups. When Alexios I Comnenus ascended to the throne of Byzantium, his early emergency reforms, such as requisitioning Church money—a previously unthinkable move—proved too little to stop the Normans.

Led by the formidable Robert Guiscard and his son Bohemund of Taranto (later, Bohemund I of Antioch), Norman forces took Dyrrhachium and Corfu, and laid siege to Larissa in Thessaly (see Battle of Dyrrhachium). Alexios suffered several defeats before being able to strike back with success. He enhanced this by bribing the German king Henry IV with 360,000 gold pieces to attack the Normans in Italy, which forced Guiscard to concentrate on his defenses at home in 1083–1084. He also secured the alliance of Henry, Count of Monte Sant'Angelo, who controlled the Gargano Peninsula and dated his charters by Alexios' reign. The Norman danger ended for the time being with the death of Robert Guiscard in 1085, combined with a Byzantine victory and crucial Venetian aid that allowed the Byzantines to retake the Balkans. Alexios had to grant the Venitians, and in general Italians, privileges to assure their support, something that eventually led to them controlling the empire's financial sector and eventually the Fourth Crusade.

Rebellion of Antioch (1104–1140)
During the time of the First Crusade, the Byzantines were able to utilize, to some extent, Norman mercenaries to defeat the Seljuk Turks in numerous battles. These Norman mercenaries were instrumental in the capture of multiple cities. It is speculated that, in exchange for an oath of loyalty, Alexios promised land around the city of Antioch to Bohemond in order to create a buffer vassal state and simultaneously keep Bohemond away from Italy. However, when Antioch fell the Normans refused to hand it over, although in time Byzantine domination was established. Out of fear that this signaled Byzantine intentions to reconquer southern Italy and remove his suzerainty over the Normans, Pope Innocent II declared the emperor an excommunicate, and threatened any Latin Christian who served in his army with the same consequence. With the death of John Comnenus the Norman Principality of Antioch rebelled once again, attacking Cyprus and invading Cilicia, which also rebelled. The quick and energetic response of Manuel Komnenus allowed the Byzantines to extract an even more favorable modus vivendi with Antioch (in 1145 being forced to provide Byzantium with a contingent of troops and allow a Byzantine garrison in the city). However, the city was given guarantees of protection against Turkic attack and Nur ad-Din Zangi abstained from attacking the northern parts of the Crusader states as a result.

Second Norman invasion of the Balkans (1147–1149)

In 1147 the Byzantine empire under Manuel I Comnenus was faced with war by Roger II of Sicily, whose fleet had captured the Byzantine island of Corfu and plundered Thebes and Corinth. However, despite being distracted by a Cuman attack in the Balkans, in 1148 Manuel enlisted the alliance of Conrad III of Germany, and the help of the Venetians, who quickly defeated Roger with their powerful fleet. In ca.1148, the political situation in the Balkans was divided by two sides, one being the alliance of the Byzantines and Venice, the other the Normans and Hungarians. The Normans were sure of the danger that the battlefield would move from the Balkans to their area in Italy. The Serbs, Hungarians and Normans exchanged envoys, being in the interest of the Normans to stop Manuel's plans to recover Italy. In 1149, Manuel recovered Corfu and prepared to take the offensive against the Normans, while Roger II sent George of Antioch with a fleet of 40 ships to pillage Constantinople's suburbs. Manuel had already agreed with Conrad on a joint invasion and partition of southern Italy and Sicily. The renewal of the German alliance remained the principal orientation of Manuel's foreign policy for the rest of his reign, despite the gradual divergence of interests between the two empires after Conrad's death. However, while Manuel was in Valona planning the offensive across the Adriatic, the Serbs revolted, posing a danger to the Byzantine Adriatic bases.

Manuel I's invasion of Italy (1155–1156)
The death of Roger in February 1154, who was succeeded by William I, combined with the widespread rebellions against the rule of the new King in Sicily and Apulia, the presence of Apulian refugees at the Byzantine court, and Frederick Barbarossa's (Conrad's successor) failure to deal with the Normans encouraged Manuel to take advantage of the multiple instabilities that existed in the Italian peninsula. He sent Michael Palaiologos and John Doukas, both of whom held the high imperial rank of sebastos, with Byzantine troops, 10 Byzantine ships, and large quantities of gold to invade Apulia (1155). The two generals were instructed to enlist the support of Frederick Barbarossa, since he was hostile to the Normans of Sicily and was south of the Alps at the time, but he declined because his demoralised army longed to get back north of the Alps as soon as possible. Nevertheless, with the help of disaffected local barons including Count Robert of Loritello, Manuel's expedition achieved astonishingly rapid progress as the whole of southern Italy rose up in rebellion against the Sicilian Crown, and the untried William I. There followed a string of spectacular successes as numerous strongholds yielded either to force or the lure of gold.

William and his army landed on the peninsula and destroyed the Greek fleet (4 ships) and army at Brindisi on May 28, 1156 and recovered Bari. Pope Adrian IV came to terms at Benevento on June 18, 1156 where he and William signed the Treaty of Benevento, abandoning the rebels and confirming William as king. During the summer of 1157, he sent a fleet of 164 ships carrying 10,000 men to sack Euboea and Almira. In 1158 William made peace with the Romans.

Third Norman invasion of the Balkans (1185–1186)
Although the last invasions and last large scale conflict between the two powers lasted less than two years, the third Norman invasions came closer still to taking Constantinople. Then Byzantine Emperor Andronikos I Komnenos had allowed the Normans to go relatively unchecked towards the Tessalonica. While David Komnenos had made some preparations in anticipation of the encroaching Normans, such as ordering reinforcement of the cities walls' and assigning four divisions to the cities' defense, these precautions proved insufficient. Only one of the four divisions actually engaged the Normans, resulting in the city being captured with relative ease by Norman forces. Upon gaining control of the city Norman forces sacked Thessalonica. The following panic resulted in a revolt placing Isaac II Angelos on the throne. In the aftermath of the fall of Andronikos, a reinforced Byzantine field army under Alexios Branas decisively defeated the Normans at the Battle of Demetritzes. Following this battle Thessalonica was speedily recovered and the Normans were pushed back to Italy. The exception was the County palatine of Cephalonia and Zakynthos, which remained in the hands of the Norman admiral Margaritus of Brindisi and his successors until it fell to the Turks in 1479.

Aftermath
With the Normans unable to take the Balkans, they turned their attention to European affairs. The Byzantines meanwhile had not possessed the will or the resources for any Italian invasion since the days of Manuel Comnenus. After the third invasion, the survival of the Empire became more important to the Byzantines than a mere province on the other side of the Adriatic Sea. The death of William II, who was without an heir, threw the kingdom into instability and upheaval, and by 1194 the Hohenstaufen had taken power, themselves being replaced in 1266 by the Angevins. The successive Sicilian rulers would eventually continue the Norman policy of domination over post-Byzantine states in the Ionian Sea and Greece, attempting to assert suzerainty over Corfu, finally conquered in 1260, the County palatine of Cephalonia and Zakynthos, the Despotate of Epirus and other territories.

Citations

General and cited sources

Primary
 Anna Comnena, translated by E. R. A. Sewter (1969). The Alexiad. London: Penguin Books. .

Secondary
 
 
 Charanis, Peter. (1952). "Aims of the Medieval Crusades and How They Were Viewed by Byzantium." Church History, Vol. 21, No. 2, pp. 123–134.
 Davis-Secord, Sarah. (2017). "Sicily at the Center of the Mediterranean". Where Three Worlds Met: Sicily in the Early Medieval Mediterranean. Cornell University Press. .
 
 
 Christopher Gravett and David Nicolle (2006). The Normans: Warrior Knights and Their Castles. Oxford: Osprey. .
 John Haldon (2000). The Byzantine Wars. The Mill: Tempest. .
 Holmes, George. (1988). The Oxford Illustrated History of Medieval Europe. Oxford University Press. .
 Richard Holmes (1988). The World Atlas of Warfare: Military Innovations That Changed the Course of History. Middlesex: Penguin. .
 Loud, G. A. (1999). "Coinage, Wealth, and Plunder in the Age of Robert Guiscard". The English Historical Review. Vol. 114, No. 458, pp. 815–843.
 
 
 McQueen, William B. "Relations Between the Normans and Byzantium 1071–1112". Byzantion, vol. 56, 1986, pp. 427–476. . Accessed 22 Apr. 2020.
 
 
 Rowe, John Gordon. (1959). "The Papacy and the Greeks (1122–1153)". Church History. Vol. 28, No. 2, pp. 115–130.
 Shepard, Jonathan. (1973). "The English and Byzantium: A Study of Their Role in the Byzantine Army in the Later Eleventh Century". Traditio, Vol. 29. pp. 53–92.
 

 
11th century in the Byzantine Empire
12th century in the Byzantine Empire
11th-century conflicts
12th-century conflicts